Carlos Kennedy Knight (born September 22, 1993) is an American actor and comedian. He co-starred as Owen Reynolds in Supah Ninjas and as Diesel (his character from Fred 2: Night of the Living Fred and also Fred 3: Camp Fred) in Fred: The Show.

Early life
Carlos Knight was born on September 22, 1993 in Columbia, South Carolina.

Career
He began his acting career performing at a number stage productions in his hometown. After attending an industry convention in Atlanta, Georgia, he was recruited by several talent agents. After signing with an agent, he moved to Los Angeles. In 2008, he guest starred on episode ER, a role for which he won a Young Artist Award in 2009 tied with Joey Luthman. In 2009, he had an uncredited role in the film Down for Life with Danny Glover as well as guest starring in the pilot episode of Southland as a teenaged boy who was shot down by a drive-by shooting. As of 2011, Knight co-stars as Owen Reynolds in Supah Ninjas. In 2012, he's playing Diesel in Fred: The Show (after Fred 2: Night of the Living Fred). On May 10, 2014
Knight made a cameo appearance in the music video for Atlanta Hip Hop artist Young Thug's single "Stoner".

Filmography

Television

References

External links
 
 

1993 births
Living people
21st-century African-American people
21st-century American male actors
Male actors from South Carolina
African-American male actors
American male child actors
American male film actors
American male television actors
Male actors from Columbia, South Carolina